Rodenstock GMBH is a German manufacturer of ophthalmic lenses and spectacle frames. The company, which was founded by Thuringian Josef Rodenstock in 1877, headquarters are based in Munich. It has a workforce of 4900 people worldwide, and is represented in more than 80 countries, including sales subsidiaries and distribution partners. Rodenstock maintains production sites for ophthalmic lenses in a total of 14 locations, in 13 countries.

History

Founding years (1877–1920) 
The company was founded in Würzburg (Germany) by Josef Rodenstock under the name Optisches Institut G. Rodenstock in 1877. In the beginning, the company produced barometers, ophthalmic lenses and -frames, scales, as well as various measuring instruments in its precision mechanics workshop. In 1880, Rodenstock developed his first patented products, the so-called Diaphragma lenses, and only two years later he already exported them to Austria, Switzerland, the Netherlands, Denmark, Italy and Russia. From 1883 onward, the company was based in Munich, and a grinding shop was established in Regen (Bavarian Forest) in 1898. In 1899, Rodenstock started producing the first sunglasses with UV protection. In 1886, he acquired the Rodenstock company grounds at Isartalstraße (today's Dreimühlenviertel); and when Josef's son Alexander Rodenstock joined the company in 1905, Rodenstock's entire production was moved to Munich.

Entering camera lens- and defence production (1920–1953) 
From the 1920s onward, Rodenstock launched the mass production of camera lenses for a large number of major camera manufacturers. As the result of pressure from the clients for these lenses, the company stopped the production of its own cameras. Between 1930 and 1939, Rodenstock established representatives and offices on all major markets worldwide. 

During WWII, Rodenstock manufactured armaments such as binoculars and optical prisms for tanks. The company also continued to manufacture eyeglasses, as those were deemed of military importance and indispensable. After the war, Rodenstock once again focused on its core competences, particularly the fields of ophthalmic lenses and -frames.

Large-scale family-run German company (1953–2000) 
Alexander Rodenstock's son Rolf Rodenstock took over the company in 1953, starting the rise of Rodenstock to a world-renowned major player in the optics industry. Since 1954, the company has increased its investment in public advertising in addition to ads in trade magazines for opticians and ophthalmologists.

In 1955, the company produced 5 million ophthalmic frames. Rodenstock continued to manufacture other optical devices, such as projection lenses for slide projectors (Splendar). In 1968, the company introduced the first photochromatic glasses in Europe, and from 1975 onwards, it produced the first plastic ophthalmic lenses in the world.

During the same time period between 1972 and 1983, the network of foreign sales corporations was further expanded. As early as in 1950/51, Rolf Rodenstock co-founded optical precision mechanics factory Industria Optica Rodenstock – Chile S.A; not as a subsidiary of Rodenstock in Germany, but rather as part of a private investment. Only later did Optische Werke G. Rodenstock KG gradually take over the Chilean manufacturer – it has been market leader in the field of ophthalmic lenses and -frames in Chile ever since. In 1983, Randolf Rodenstock joined the group of shareholders at Optische Werke G. Rodenstock as a personally liable partner (general partner), leading the company together with his father Rolf Rodenstock.

In 1989, Rodenstock shifted the majority of its Munich production capabilities to its newly established serial production facilities in Thailand and its production facilities in Ebersberg were moved to Malta. Between 1988 and 1989, revenues decreased by 10% from previously €700 million. 1991 saw the introduction of the R logo and trademark.

Between 1995 and 1996, the company built a new production facility for prescription lenses in Klatovy (Czech Republic). The Rodenstock Präzisionsoptik precision optics division, which include the production of lenses for analogue view cameras (a.o. the Sironar, Apo-Ronar, and Grandagon brands), enlargers (e.g. the Rodagon), and digital view cameras with high-resolution digital camera backs (e.g. the 1997 Apo-Sironar digital) was spun off in 1996 as Rodenstock Photo Optics, a new company and in 2000, it was acquired by Göttingen-based Linos Photonics AG.

Rodenstock GmbH (2000–2010) 
In 2002, the remaining business segment Eyewear was transferred from Optische Werke G. Rodenstock into the newly founded corporation Rodenstock GmbH. Due to considerable business difficulties in the US, the company faced a severe crisis in 2003. In the same year, investor group Permira bought into Rodenstock with a 49% share. In 2004, Permira increased its ownership share to 85%, the Rodenstock family still held 10%, while the management held the remaining 5%. Under Permira, comprehensive restructuring measures were implemented.

In 2006, Permira sold its 85% share in Rodenstock to investment company Bridgepoint. Bridgepoint thus owned 95% of Rodenstock. The management still held the remaining 5%. In the same year, the company began tapping new market segments for opticians with its ImpressionIST service terminal. Also in 2006, Linos Photonics (which held the now-independent Rodenstock Precision Optics brand) was acquired by Qioptiq Group, based in Luxembourg, in 2006; the merger was completed in 2009.

Since 2009, Rodenstock has offered portfolios for progressive lenses.

In June 2010, the German Federal Cartel Office imposed fines totalling €115m on the ZVA (German Association of Opticians and Optometrists) as well as several manufacturers of ophthalmic lenses as the result of illegal cartel agreements.

Rodenstock Precision Optics changed from being a brand of Qioptiq to Excelitas Technologies, a private equity firm, in 2013 after Qioptiq was acquired by Excelitas. These independent entities still operate with the same stylized "R" logo.

Rodenstock Group (2010-to date)
2012 saw the introduction of Eye Lens Technology – a type of ophthalmic lens that considers astigmatism adjustments as well as Listing's law for close proximity, enabling the manufacturer to calculate physiologically correct close-proximity refractive indices, thus taking full advantage of the spectacle wearer's eyesight.

After 126 years next to the river Isar, Rodenstock moved its headquarters to Elsenheimerstraße in the west of Munich city.

In 2018, Rodenstock introduced the DNEye Pro technology to the market.

2020 saw the introduction of B.I.G. VISION® FOR ALL, a new company philosophy. Rodenstock is measuring each eye based on thousands of data metrics. This data is then used for the production of biometric ophthalmic lenses.

In 2021, Apax Fonds announced the acquisition of the Rodenstock Group.

In 2022, Rodenstock will be offering a lens that is supported by artificial intelligence.

Current product portfolio 
The company is currently dealing in the development, production and distribution of ophthalmic lenses and -frames, as well as sunglasses, sports eyewear, reading glasses, computer glasses, and driving glasses.

Rodenstock distributes these products via its own brand Rodenstock as well as license brand Porsche Design.

The company's range of products includes single vision lenses, progressive lenses, as well as tinted and photocromatic lenses. Furthermore, the company provides special products for antique lorgnettes, monocles, magnifying glasses, pince-nezes, or diving masks.

Production facilities 

 Lens glazing sites: Denmark, Italy, Norway, Sweden, Switzerland, Australia, United Kingdom
 Regional lens production facilities: Brazil, Chile, Uruguay
 Central lens production facilities: Regen, Klatovy, Bangkok
 Serial production: Bangkok
 Subsidiary: optoVision in Langen (Hesse)

Rodenstock maintains production facilities at 14 locations in 13 countries. The company has around 4,900 employees worldwide.

Recognitions and design awards 
Since 1964, more than 60 Eyewear models made by Rodenstock and Porsche Design won design awards such as the iF Product Design Award and the RedDot Award. In 2012, video centration system ImpressionIST 3 was recognized with the iF Product Design Award by Industrie Forum Design Hannover.  In the field of optical lenses, Rodenstock won three Silmo d’Or Awards in 2012.

The Rodenstock Perfection R8005 spectacle frame won the category „Special Mention for Outstanding Design Quality“ at the 2014 German Design Award.

In 2020, the P‘8362 Porsche Design glasses won the iF Product Design Award by Industrie Forum Design Hannover.

Rodenstock generations 

Josef Rodenstock (1878–1905)
On 1 January 1878, Josef Rodenstock (32), a peddler of self-designed measuring instruments and spectacle frames from Thuringia, began business operations together with his brother Michael of the company "G. Rodenstock" which had been founded in Würzburg in 1877.

Alexander Rodenstock (1905–1953)
Alexander Rodenstock joined the company at the age of 22 in 1905. He had given up his studies of physics and economics at the urging of his father and started to prepare to take over the management of the family company; he did so in 1919.

Rolf Rodenstock (1953–1990)
Rolf Rodenstock had a diploma in general business, a doctorate and a professorship. He took over the helm of the family company from his father in 1953. He supervised the reconstruction of the company and Rodenstock's own "economic miracle" and was considered one of the most respected corporate personalities of the still young Federal Republic.

 (1990–2003)
Randolf Rodenstock joined the company in 1976 and initially managed the company together with his father following his study of physics at Munich University and a subsequent MBA at the INSEAD management school in Fontainebleau, France. He took over general responsibility for the company in 1990 and focused the company on the demands of increasing industrial globalization.

Trivia 
At the turn of the last century, Jose Rodenstock served as court optician of the German Emperor.  During WWI, Rodenstock produced the Robra gas mask glasses for the German army. Starting in the 1950s, in addition to product information, the company also used advertising to cultivate its image: Rodenstock was the first in the business to hire internationally renowned stars such as Brigitte Bardot, Carl Möhner, Curd Jürgens, Gina Lollobrigida, Hildegard Knef, Senta Berger, Toni Sailer or Roy Black as testimonials.

In the 1990s, Rodenstock was the first company to introduce the guarantee promise for ophthalmic lenses.

References

External links 

 http://www.rodenstock.com



 
Lens manufacturers
Optics manufacturing companies
German brands
Manufacturing companies established in 1877
German companies established in 1877
Eyewear companies of Germany
2021 mergers and acquisitions